Dorudgah (also Romanized as  Doroūdgāh, Darudgah, and Drūdgāh; also known as Dowrūdgāh) is a village in Zirrah Rural District of Sadabad District, Dashtestan County, Bushehr province, Iran. At the 2006 census, its population was 2,640 in 547 households. The following census in 2011 counted 3,090 people in 750 households. The latest census in 2016 showed a population of 2,820 people in 832 households; it was the largest village in its rural district.

References 

Populated places in Dashtestan County